During the 1998–99 English football season, Bury F.C. competed in the Football League First Division.

Season summary
After Stan Ternent moved to Burnley in the summer of 1998, Bury appointed Neil Warnock as manager, but with sales of players such as Paul Butler to Sunderland and a cash crisis at the club, Bury suffered relegation from Division One in May 1999, but only on goals scored. This was the only season where goals scored took precedence over goal difference. If it were not for this rule, Bury would have survived at the expense of Port Vale.

Final league table

Results
Bury's score comes first

Legend

Football League First Division

FA Cup

League Cup

First-team squad
Squad at end of season

Left club during season

References

Bury F.C. seasons
Bury